The following is the list of Iraqi Premier League top scorers by season from 1974–75. The latest top scorer is Syrian player Mahmoud Al-Mawas of Al-Shorta, who scored 22 goals in 2021–22, becoming the first non-Iraqi player to win the award.

Younis Abed Ali holds the record for most goals in a single season at 36, while Zahrawi Jaber scored the fewest goals in a season for a league top scorer at six. Eleven players were top scorers in more than one season: Thamer Yousif, Ali Hussein Mahmoud, Hussein Saeed, Ahmed Radhi, Rahim Hameed, Karim Saddam, Hashim Ridha, Ahmed Salah, Amjad Radhi, Hammadi Ahmed and Alaa Abdul-Zahra. Rahim Hameed became the first player to become the league's top scorer three times in a row, in 1985–86, 1986–87 and 1987–88. Karim Saddam is the most successful player by winning the top scorer award four times, in 1988–89, 1989–90, 1990–91 and 1992–93. Sahib Abbas is the all-time scorer of the Iraqi Premier League after scoring 177 goals between 1988 and 2012.

Winners

Awards won by player

Awards won by nationality

Awards won by club

All-time scorers

The table below contains the all-time top scorers of the Iraqi Premier League since its establishment in 1974–75.
 

Italics denotes players still playing professional football,Bold denotes players still playing in the Iraqi Premier League.

See also
 Soccer Iraq Goal of the Season

References

Iraqi Premier League
Iraqi Premier League
Iraq
Iraq